The Freiungspitzen (plural) are a group of 3 peaks in the Erlspitze Group in the Karwendel Alps on the territory of the Austrian municipality of Zirl.

Ascents 
The Freiungen Ridgeway (Freiungen-Höhenweg, a partially secured mountain path) between the  Nördlinger Hut and the Solsteinhaus runs past the tops. The west top of the Freiungen is easy to ascend.

References

Literature 
 Walter Klier: Alpenvereinsführer Karwendel alpin, 15th edn., 2005, Bergverlag Rudolf  Rother, Munich,

External links 
 Tour description

Two-thousanders of Austria
Mountains of Tyrol (state)
Mountains of the Alps
Karwendel